Sopwell may refer to:

Sopwell, County Tipperary, a townland in Ireland
Sopwell, Hertfordshire, England
Sopwell House, a large house, now a hotel in Hertfordshire, England
Sopwell Priory, a ruined priory in Hertfordshire, England